Epperley is the eponymous debut studio album by the Oklahoma band Epperley.  The song "Shy" was featured in an episode of Buffy the Vampire Slayer.

Track listing
All songs and lyrics by Epperley.
 "Nice Guy Eddie" – 4:55
 "Golden Shower" – 3:51
 "If" – 2:44
 "Ride Away" – 3:32
 "Pulse" – 2:57
 "Wait" – 5:03
 "Motivator" – 4:10
 "Buzz On" – 3:21
 "Love Day" – 2:56
 "Shy" – 4:47
 "Its Universal" – 3:52
 "Disillusioned Jesus" – 6:21

Personnel
R. David Bynum – bass
Matthew Nader – guitar, vocals
David Terry – vocals, guitar
John Truskett – drums, percussion

Additional personnel
Ed Robinson – engineer
Kevin Gray -mastering
David Taylor – cover art
William H. Dittman -band photos

References

1996 albums